Michael H. Dickinson (born 1963) is an American fly bioengineer and neuroscientist, and Zarem Professor of Biology and Bioengineering at the California Institute of Technology. He studies Drosophila flight control systems and sensory processing and was dubbed the Fly Guy by The Scientist.

Early life and education
Dickinson was born in Seaford, Delaware in 1963 but grew up in Baltimore before moving to Philadelphia. He graduated from Brown University with a B.S. in 1984, and from University of Washington with a Ph.D. in 1989. He did his postdoctoral work with Karl Georg Götz at the University of Tübingen.

Career and Research
He was an assistant professor at the University of Chicago in 1991, before moving to the University of California, Berkeley in 1996. He was at California Institute of Technology from 2002 to 2011 before moving to the University of Washington for 2010 to 2014. He is now back at Caltech.

He is a Monitoring Editor at the Journal of Experimental Biology. He was a course director of the Neural Systems and Behavior course at the Marine Biological Laboratory.

Awards
 1990 Larry Sandler Memorial Award 
 2001 MacArthur Fellows Program
 2008 American Academy of Arts and Sciences

Sources
"Micro Warfare", Popular Mechanics, Feb 2001
"Flyorama", Popular Science, Dec 2002

References

External links
"Focusing on Fruit Flies, Curiosity Takes Flight", New York Times
"Flies In Danger Escape With Safety Dance", NPR, Joe Palca
"Fly Flight Simulators", ScienCentral
"Michael H. Dickson", Scientific Commons
"How a fly flies" (TED conference)

1963 births
American bioengineers
Brown University alumni
University of Washington alumni
University of California, Berkeley faculty
California Institute of Technology faculty
Living people
MacArthur Fellows